GTR, formerly known as The General Tyre and Rubber Company of Pakistan Limited is a Pakistani tyre manufacturing company based in Karachi.

History
The company was established by General Tire International Corporation (GTIC) in 1963 at Landhi, Karachi on a 25-acre plot and commenced its production in 1964 with a total capacity of only 120,000 tyres per annum.

GTIC sold 90% of their shares to the present owners M/s Bibojee Services Ltd. in 1977 and retained 10% of the ownership. In 1985, the Company completed a major expansion, which took the capacity to 600,000 tyres annually.

Continental AG, Germany’s tyre manufacturer purchased GTIC in 1987 and thus became 10% owners in GTR. Continental provides technical assistance to General Tyres and Rubber.

The brand name “GENERAL” also belongs to Continental AG. Currently, the capacity of the company stands at 2.3 million tyres approximately. GTR has been and still is one of the largest tyre manufacturer Pakistan.

Being a public listed Company; the current main sponsors of the Company beside Bibojee Services are Pak Kuwait Investment Company, NIT and Continental AG of Germany. The remaining shares are held by the general public.

References 

Tyre manufacturers of Pakistan
Manufacturing companies based in Karachi
Manufacturing companies established in 1963
Pakistani subsidiaries of foreign companies
Companies listed on the Pakistan Stock Exchange
1977 mergers and acquisitions
Pakistani companies established in 1963